The Belair Stable Museum is located at 2835 Belair Drive in Bowie, Maryland. It is operated by the City of Bowie, Maryland. The building once housed the Belair Stud Farm until 1957 when the Woodward family sold the Belair Estate to Levitt & Sons for the construction of Belair at Bowie.

This U-shaped sandstone equine stable was built in 1907 for James T. Woodward, then owner of the Belair Mansion. The elaborate stable building reflects Belair's long and distinguished association with thoroughbred horse racing and breeding.

The stable sits on  located about 1000  feet northeast of the Belair Mansion. Once part of the large estate, the stable building is now surrounded by residential development. The building itself is a U-shaped structure with a -story main block and single-story flanking wings, forming an open exercise yard to the center.

Further reading

References

External links
 Belair Stable Museum in the City of Bowie, Maryland
 National Register of Historic Places
 The City of Bowie, Maryland
 Belair Stable Historical Marker
 

Buildings and structures in Bowie, Maryland
Agricultural buildings and structures on the National Register of Historic Places in Maryland
Museums in Prince George's County, Maryland
Sports museums in Maryland
Equestrian museums in the United States
Buildings and structures completed in 1907
National Register of Historic Places in Prince George's County, Maryland